John Blackstocke Butterworth, Baron Butterworth  (13 March 1918 – 19 June 2003) was a British lawyer and the first Vice-Chancellor of the University of Warwick.

Butterworth was graduated in jurisprudence from Oxford University. On the eve of the Second World War he enlisted in the Royal Artillery and spent much of the war in Scotland, protecting strategic targets from air attack.

Background and family

He qualified in 1946 as a barrister at Lincoln's Inn, and then became a law tutor at New College, Oxford. He had a reputation as an outstanding teacher and he was made an Honorary Bencher of Lincoln's Inn in 1953. He was quick-witted and shrewd, which accounts for his appointment as bursar of New College for the last seven years of his time at Oxford.

Butterworth married his wife Doris in 1948 and they had one son and two daughters, including Anna Walker, who became a senior civil servant of some distinction.

University of Warwick

In 1963, he became the first Vice-Chancellor of the University of Warwick. Warwick was one of the handful of new universities created in the wake of the Robbins Report (1962). One of his colleagues at the time described him as "a noisy" vice-chancellor.

Butterworth believed strongly that his job was to select professors who would be leaders in their discipline and that he should stand aside and let them develop their subjects in their own way (though within a tight budget). Because he had worked only at Oxford, he wanted Oxford's standards of academic performance at the undergraduate level and in research. He had a belief that Warwick must maintain a balance between 'pure' and 'applied' disciplines: you could justify a strong commitment to the Humanities if you had a Business School, a very pure Maths Department if you had Engineering.

A large part of Warwick's success stems from Butterworth's cultivation of links with the rich industrial enterprises of the Midlands. One of his first creations was an industrial centre, intended as a stimulus of advanced engineering in the region. Similarly, he cultivated (and earned) municipal goodwill.

He also built the Warwick Arts Centre. His link with Miss Martin, the famous 'Anonymous Benefactor', represented the crucial launching pad for the project, but funds came from many sources including a contribution for the third and final phase from the about to be abolished West Midlands County Council whose gift was steered through by a Coventry Councillor. It was somehow typical that Butterworth, whose politics could not have been more different, could persuade a left wing politician that such a project deserved support. He traded on the sympathies of his friends on grantmaking committees for consideration of Warwick and held forth without giving quarter to ministers he happened to bump into in corridors.

Butterworth's period as vice-chancellor was not without controversy, particularly regarding his opposition to the establishment of a Students' union. Above the main bar of the Students Union building at Warwick University there is an inscription quoting him as saying "The Students' union shall never have its own building". His period of office included the student protests beginning in the late 1960s. During one event the vice-chancellor's office was occupied and files rummaged through. These protests were supported by the social historian, the late Professor Edward Thompson, one of Butterworth's own appointments.

Other activities

His other passions were the Association of Commonwealth Universities, a post-imperial organisation devoted to providing assistance to anglophone universities in developing countries, of which he was chairman for ten years; and the Foundation for Science and Technology, of which he became chairman in 1990, subsequently holding the position of president until his death.

Butterworth was also the chairman of Midland Community Radio, the consortium which successfully bid for the Independent Local Radio franchise for Coventry and Warwickshire. The radio station launched as Mercia Sound in 1980.

Peerage

He was appointed to the House of Lords as a life peer on retirement from the University in 1985. He was created Baron Butterworth, of Warwick in the County of Warwickshire on 15 May 1985, and he took the Conservative whip.

References

People from Sutton-in-Ashfield
English barristers
Fellows of New College, Oxford
Conservative Party (UK) life peers 
Commanders of the Order of the British Empire
Vice-Chancellors of the University of Warwick
Deputy Lieutenants of Warwickshire
Deputy Lieutenants of the West Midlands (county)
1918 births
2003 deaths
Legal scholars of the University of Oxford
20th-century English lawyers
British Army personnel of World War II
Royal Artillery personnel
Life peers created by Elizabeth II